The men's 200 metres event at the 2019 African Games was held on 29 and 30 August in Rabat.

Medalists

Results

Heats
Qualification: First 2 in each heat (Q) and the next 8 fastest (q) advanced to the semifinals.

Wind:Heat 1: +0.5 m/s, Heat 2: -0.3 m/s, Heat 3: +0.4 m/s, Heat 4: +0.4 m/s, Heat 5: +0.5 m/s, Heat 6: +0.3 m/s, Heat 7: +0.2 m/s, Heat 8: +0.3 m/s

Semifinals
Qualification: First 2 in each semifinal (Q) and the next 2 fastest (q) advanced to the final.

Wind:Heat 1: +0.9 m/s, Heat 2: 0.0 m/s, Heat 3: -0.2 m/s

Final
Wind: -0.8 m/s

References

200
African Games